Oliver Warner (April 17, 1818 – September 14, 1885) was a Massachusetts clergyman, politician, and librarian who served in both houses of the Massachusetts legislature and, from 1858 to 1876, served as the 14th Secretary of the Commonwealth.

Early life
Warner was one of nine children born to Rhoda (Bridgman) and Oliver Warner on 17 Apr 1818 in Northampton, Massachusetts.

Education
Warner graduated Phi Beta Kappa from Williams College in 1842. After his gradation from Williams, Warner attended Gilmanton Theological Seminary.

Marriage
On May 29, 1844, Warner married Jane S. Daniels.

Early career
From 1844 to 1846, Warner officiated as a Congregational clergyman in Chesterfield, Massachusetts. In 1852 and 1853, Warner was a tutor at the Williston Seminary in Easthampton, Massachusetts.

Massachusetts legislature
Oliver served in the Massachusetts House of Representatives from 1854 and 1855 and in the Massachusetts Senate from 1856 to 1857.

Massachusetts Secretary of the Commonwealth
Warner served as the Massachusetts Secretary of the Commonwealth for 18 years to 1876.

1872 election
In the 1872 election, Warner's majority was greater than any other Republican statewide office candidate.

1875 election
In 1875, Warner ran for re-election, but he lost the Republican nomination for Massachusetts Secretary of the Commonwealth.

Later career
From 1876 to 1879, Warner was the librarian of the Massachusetts State Library.

Second Marriage
On October 2, 1882, Warner married Miss. Harriet M. Newhall of Lynn, Massachusetts.

Death
Warner died in Lynn, Massachusetts, on September 14, 1885.

References

External links

1818 births
1885 deaths
Politicians from Northampton, Massachusetts
Secretaries of the Commonwealth of Massachusetts
Republican Party members of the Massachusetts House of Representatives
Republican Party Massachusetts state senators
Williams College alumni
19th-century American politicians